Sabiá Futebol Clube, commonly known as Sabiá, is a Brazilian football club based in Caxias, Maranhão state.

History
The club was founded on January 18, 2011, being named after the true thrush bird, and depicting it in their logo. They finished in the second place in the Campeonato Maranhense Second Level in 2011, losing the title to Viana and thus being promoted to the 2012 Campeonato Maranhense.

Stadium
Sabiá Futebol Clube play their home games at Estádio Duque de Caxias. The stadium has a maximum capacity of 3,500 people.

References

Association football clubs established in 2011
Football clubs in Maranhão
2011 establishments in Brazil